Daniel Alejandro López and Matteo Trevisan were the defending champions but did not compete in the Juniors this year.

Hsieh Cheng-peng and Yang Tsung-hua defeated Matt Reid and Bernard Tomic in the final, 6–4, 2–6, 12–10 to win the boys' doubles tennis title at the 2008 Wimbledon Championships.

Seeds

  Henrique Cunha /  César Ramírez (first round)
  Ryan Harrison /  Bradley Klahn (quarterfinals)
  Matt Reid /  Bernard Tomic (final)
  Grigor Dimitrov /  Henri Kontinen (second round)
  Alexandre Folie /  David Goffin (semifinals)
  Marcelo Arévalo /  Takanyi Garanganga (first round)
  Jarmere Jenkins /  Chase Buchanan (first round)
  Hiroki Moriya /  Peerakit Siributwong (first round)

Draw

Finals

Top half

Bottom half

References

External links

Boys' Doubles
Wimbledon Championship by year – Boys' doubles